Anfu ham is a type of dry-cured ham named after the town of Anfu in Jiangxi, China, where it originated. The ham gets its flavor from being salted and smoked and can be eaten on its own or used to add flavor to dishes. It is made in Anfu and other locations.

Anfu ham originates from the Qin Dynasty. In 1915, Anfu ham was featured in the Panama–Pacific International Exposition. Its skin is very thin but the meat is very thick. It is red with a yellowish tint. Chinaculture.org, a project of the Ministry of Culture of the People's Republic of China and the China Daily, described its shape as being "like willow leaves". Anfu ham can remain edible for years.

See also

 List of ancient dishes
 List of hams

Chinese hams
 Jinhua ham
 Rugao ham
 Xuanwei ham

References

Further reading
 《中国民俗知识: 江西民俗》。 甘肃人民出版社, 2008. p. 1-2.
 《中国名食集萃》。 中国展望出版社, 1986. p. ix, 155, 156.

External links
 Chinese Ham You Never Know Before. Study in China.

Chinese cuisine
Jiangxi
Ham
Ancient dishes